Wahlenbergia scopulicola is a herbaceous plant in the family Campanulaceae native to eastern Australia.

It blooms throughout the year producing blue flowers.

The species is found in New South Wales and Queensland.

References

External links
Wahlenbergia scopulicola: Occurrence data from the Australasian Virtual Herbarium

scopulicola
Flora of New South Wales
Flora of Queensland
Taxa named by Roger Charles Carolin